Svetlana Zelenkovskaya (born 1977) is a Belarusian and Ukrainian theater and film actress.

Biography 
Zelenkovskaya was born in Minsk, Belarus, on 29 May 1977. From 1998 to 2017, she was performing at the Yanka Kupala National Academic Theater (Minsk, Belarus).

Theater

Yanka Kupala National Theater 

 Pyramid of Cheops (Tanya)
 Eternal Phoma (Nastenka)
 KIM (Julia)
 Idyll (Dancer)
 Forest (Aksyusha)
 A Midsummer Night Dream (Elena)
 Pavlinka (Pavlinka)
 Black Lady Nesvizh (Barbara Radziwil)
 Lost Paradise (Eve)
 SV (Charlotte)
 Chichikov (wife of the police chief)
 Snow Queen (Snow Queen)
 Maestro (Ilona, French horn)
 Macbeth (Lady Macbeth)
 Vanyushin's children

Production center "Magic" 

 Woyzeck (Maria)

Contemporary Art Theater 

 FM Muchevo
 The Secret of the Dance

Films 

 1983 - The Tale of the Star Boy
 1985 - Come and See
 2000 - Kamenskaya
 2003 - Anastasia Slutskaya - Princess Anastasia Slutskaya
 2003 - Occupation. Mysteries - Eve
 2005 - Three Tallers - Mother
 2006 - Vaccine
 2006 - Your Honor
 2006 - I am a Detective
 2007 - Major Vetrov - Blonde
 2008 - Riorita - German Prisoner
 2009 - Semin. Life Merchants - Brunette
 2009 - Court.
 2010 - Masakra - Landowner Ostrovskaya
 2010 - The Irony of Luck
 2010 - Zhurov-2
 2010 - Assassination Attempt - Inga, the registrar at a German hospital
 2011 - Lonely Island

References

See also 

 Светлана Зеленковская: я сильно изменилась после встречи с Михалком, интервью 2018 г.
 Светлана Зеленковская получила вид на жительство в Украине, статья 2016 г.

Belarusian State Academy of Arts alumni
Belarusian film actresses
21st-century Belarusian actresses
21st-century Ukrainian actresses
Living people
1977 births